Maurice Charles Kenneth Tweedie (born September 30, 1919 – died March 14, 1996), or Kenneth Tweedie, was a British medical physicist and statistician from the University of Liverpool. He was known for research into the exponential family probability distributions.

Education and career 
Tweedie read physics at the University of Reading and attained a B.Sc. (general) and B.Sc. (special) in physics in 1939 followed by a M.Sc. in physics 1941.  He found a career in radiation physics, but his primary interest was in mathematical statistics where his accomplishments far surpassed his academic postings.

Contributions

Tweedie distributions
Tweedie's contributions included pioneering work with the Inverse Gaussian distribution.  Arguably his major achievement rests with the definition of a family of exponential dispersion models characterized by closure under additive and reproductive convolution as well as under transformations of scale that are now known as the Tweedie exponential dispersion models.
As a consequence of these properties the Tweedie exponential dispersion models are characterized by a power law relationship between the variance and the mean which leads them to become the foci of convergence for a central limit like effect that acts on a wide variety of random data.  The range of application of the Tweedie distributions is wide and includes:
Taylor's law,
fluctuation scaling,
1/f noise,
random matrix theory, 
hematogenous cancer metastasis, 
genomic structure and evolution,
regional blood flow heterogeneity,  
multifractality.
self-organized criticality

Tweedie's Formula
An additional area of Tweedie's work was the development of a formula which Efron (2011) described as offering "a simple empirical Bayes approach to correcting selection bias".

References 

People from Reading, Berkshire
Alumni of the University of Reading
Medical physicists
1919 births
1996 deaths
Academics of the University of Manchester
Academics of the University of Liverpool
British statisticians